Clabaugh is a surname. Notable people with the surname include:

Charles W. Clabaugh (1900–1983), American educator, businessman, and politician
Harry M. Clabaugh (1856–1914), American judge
Moose Clabaugh (1901–1984), American baseball player